Tronco means trunk, torso, truncated in several Romance languages. It is the surname of the following people:
Cristopher Tronco Sánchez (born 1985), Mexican swimmer
Louriza Tronco (born 1993), Canadian actress and singer 
Robbie Tronco, American DJ